Chang Gung University of Science and Technology (CGUST) is a private university in Guishan District, Taoyuan City, and Puzi City, Chiayi County of Taiwan.

History
CGUST was originally established as Ming Chi College of Technology in 1983. In 1988, the Chang Gung Institute of Nursing was established as a two-year junior college program for nursing. A five-year program was established in 1991 and the institute was promoted to Chang Gung Institute of Technology. It also offered a two-year college program. In 2004, the institute offered a four-year college program. In August 2011 name was changed to Chang Gung University of Science and Technology.

Faculties
 College of Nursing
 College of Human Ecology
 Center for General Education

Transportation
The Taoyuan Campus is within walking distance south of National Taiwan Sport University Station of Taoyuan Airport MRT. The Chiayi Campus is within walking distance west from Chiayi Station of the Taiwan High Speed Rail.

See also
 List of universities in Taiwan

References

External links
 

1983 establishments in Taiwan
Educational institutions established in 1983
Formosa Plastics Group
Private universities and colleges in Taiwan
Universities and colleges in Chiayi County
Universities and colleges in Taoyuan City
Scientific organizations based in Taiwan
Universities and colleges in Taiwan
Technical universities and colleges in Taiwan